The following lists events that happened during 2006 in Algeria.

Incumbents
 President: Abdelaziz Bouteflika
 Prime Minister: Ahmed Ouyahia (until 24 May), Abdelaziz Belkhadem (starting 24 May)

Events

March
 March 12 – Abdelhak Layada, one of the founders of the Armed Islamic Group (GIA), is released from prison due to the February 28, 2006, national reconciliation charter decree of application.

References

 
Years of the 21st century in Algeria
2000s in Algeria
Algeria
Algeria